Aelred of Rievaulx, O Cist.; also Ailred, Ælred, and Æthelred; (1110 – 12 January 1167) was an English Cistercian monk, abbot of Rievaulx from 1147 until his death, and known as a  writer. He is regarded by Anglicans and Catholics as a saint.

Life

Aelred was born in Hexham, Northumbria, in year 1110, one of three sons of Eilaf, priest of St Andrew's at Hexham, himself a son of another Eilaf, treasurer of Durham. In 1095, the Council of Claremont had forbidden the ordination of the sons of priests. This was done in part to end the inheritance of benefices. He may have been partially educated by Lawrence of Durham, who sent him a hagiography of Saint Brigid.

Aelred's early education was probably at the cathedral school at Durham. Aelred spent several years at the court of King David I of Scotland in Roxburgh, possibly from the age of 14, rising to the rank of echonomus (often translated "steward" or "Master of the Household") before leaving the court at age twenty-four (in 1134) to enter the Cistercian abbey of Rievaulx in Yorkshire.

In 1138, when Rievaulx's patron, Walter Espec, was to surrender his Wark on Tweed Castle to King David of Scotland, Aelred reportedly accompanied Abbot William of Rievaulx to the Scottish border to negotiate the transfer. He saw that his reluctance to part from his friends at court, delayed his adopting his monastic calling. For Aelred, the source and object of true friendship is Christ.

In 1142 Aelred travelled to Rome, alongside Walter of London, Archdeacon of York, to represent before Pope Innocent II the northern prelates who opposed the election of Henry de Sully, nephew of King Stephen as archbishop of York. The result of the journey was that Aelred brought back a letter from Pope Innocent summoning the superiors whom Aelred represented to appear in Rome the following March to make their deposition in the required canonical form. The resulting negotiations dragged on for many years.

Upon his return from Rome, Aelred became novice master at Rievaulx. In 1143, he was appointed abbot of the new Revesby Abbey, a daughter house of Rievaulx in Lincolnshire. In 1147, he was elected abbot of Rievaulx itself, a position he was to hold until his death. Under his administration, the abbey is said to have grown to some 140 monks and 500 conversi and laymen.

His role as abbot required him to travel. Cistercian abbots were expected to make annual visitations to daughter-houses, and Rievaulx had five in England and Scotland by the time Aelred held office. Moreover, Aelred had to make the long sea journey to the annual general chapter of the Order at Cîteaux in France.

Alongside his role as a monk and later abbot, Aelred was involved throughout his life in political affairs. The fourteenth-century version of the Peterborough Chronicle states that Aelred's efforts during the twelfth-century papal schism brought about Henry II's decisive support for the Cistercian candidate, resulting in 1161 in the formal recognition of Pope Alexander III.

Aelred wrote several influential books on spirituality, among them Speculum caritatis ("The Mirror of Charity," reportedly written at the request of Bernard of Clairvaux) and De spiritali amicitia ("On Spiritual Friendship").

He also wrote seven works of history, addressing three of them to Henry II of England, advising him how to be a good king and declaring him to be the true descendant of Anglo-Saxon kings.

In his later years, he is thought to have suffered from the kidney stones and arthritis. Walter reports that in 1157 the Cistercian General Council allowed him to sleep and eat in Rievaulx's infirmary; later he lived in a nearby building constructed for him.

Aelred died in the winter of 1166–7, probably on 12 January 1167 at Rievaulx.

De spirituali amicitia
De spirituali amicitia (Spiritual Friendship), considered to be his greatest work, is a Christian counterpart of Cicero's De amicitia and designates Christ as the source and ultimate impetus of spiritual friendship. Friendship was a recurring theme in Christian monasticism. Gregory of Nazianzus, echoing Aristotle, describes his friendship with Basil the Great as "two bodies with a single spirit".

It was likely at Durham that Aelred first encountered Cicero's Laelius de Amicitia. In Roman terminology amicitia means "friendship" and could be between states or individuals. It suggested an equality of status and in practice it might only be an alliance to pursue mutual interests. For Cicero, amicitia involved genuine trust and affection. "But I must at the very beginning lay down this principle —friendship can only exist between good men. We mean then by the 'good' those whose actions and lives leave no question as to their honour, purity, equity, and liberality; who are free from greed, lust, and violence; and who have the courage of their convictions."

In Confessions, Augustine of Hippo identifies three phases of friendship: adolescence, early adulthood and adulthood. Adolescent friendships is essentially self-interested comradery. Augustine then describes a close friendship he had as a young adult with a colleague. This was based on love and grew out of shared interests and experiences and what each learned from the other. The third mature phase for Augustine is transcendent in that he loves others "in Christ", in that the focus is on Christ and the point of friendship is to grow closer to Christ with and through friends. In writing of adolescent friendship Augustine said, "For I even burnt in my youth heretofore, to be satiated in things below; and I dared to grow wild again, with these various and shadowy loves: my beauty consumed away, …pleasing myself, and desirous to please in the eyes of men. And what was it that I delighted in, but to love, and be loved?"

Aelred was greatly influenced by Cicero, but later modified his interpretation upon reading Augustine of Hippo's Confessions. In De spirituali amicitiâ, Aelred adopted Cicero's dialogue format. In the Prologue however, he mirrors Augustine's description of his early adolescence with the speaker describing his time at school, where "the charm of my companions gave me the greatest pleasure. Among the usual faults that often endanger youth, my mind surrendered wholly to affection and became devoted to love. Nothing seemed sweeter to me, nothing more pleasant, nothing more valuable than to be loved and to love."

Posthumous reputation

Aelred was never formally canonised in the manner that was later established, but he became the centre of a cult in the north of England that was officially recognised by Cistercians in 1476. As such, he was venerated as a saint, with his body kept at Rievaulx. In the sixteenth century, before the dissolution of the monastery, John Leland, claims he saw Aelred's shrine at Rievaulx containing Aelred's body glittering with gold and silver. Today, Aelred of Rievaulx is listed as a saint on 12 January, the traditional date of his death, in the latest official edition of the Roman Martyrology, which expresses the official position of the Roman Catholic Church.

He also appears in the calendars of various other Christian denominations.

Much of Aelred's history is known because of the Life written about him by Walter Daniel shortly after his death.

For many centuries his most famous work has been his Life of Saint Edward, King and Confessor.

Aelred is remembered in the Church of England with a Lesser Festival and on the Episcopal Church calendar with a feast on 12 January.

Sexuality
The historian John Boswell has argued that Aelred was homosexual. In particular, his work De spirituali amicitia ("On Spiritual Friendship") reveals a "conscious homosexual orientation". Brian McGuire has concluded that "...his sexual identity remains uncertain", yet that in all likelihood it is a "typically twentieth-century misuse of medieval sources to translate the intense language and practice of friendship into evidence of repressed homosexual behaviour." Many historiographers, such as Evans, have called Boswell's analysis 'misguided' – as Evans argues, such an approach "collapses in the face of a far more convincing historical literature which has located the emergence of [explicitly] homosexual identities at the end of the nineteenth century." As Marsha L. Dutton summarised as editor of the 2017 Companion to Aelred of Rievaulx (the most recent summative on Aelred) that "...there is no way of knowing the details of Aelred's life, much less his sexual experience or struggles."

However, Elizabeth Freeman has commented that discussion of his alleged homosexuality has abounded atop misunderstandings of monastic language and mistaking his interest in Christian friendship for homosexuality. "We are witness", Freeman says, "to [a] pointless debate over his alleged homosexuality". Aelred confessed in De institutione inclusarum that for a while he surrendered himself to lust, "a cloud of desire arose from the lower drives of the flesh and the gushing spring of adolescence" and "the sweetness of love and impurity of lust combined to take advantage of the inexperience of my youth." LeClercq states that this is likely a 'literary exaggeration' common to monastic writing. He also refers directly to the relationship of Jesus and John the Apostle as a "marriage", which is aligned with Cistercian emphasis upon the Song of Songs, and the symbolism of love between man and God, expressed through a predominantly Virgilian and Ovidian topos. Aelred himself, in his own words, called this "marriage" an 'organ of experience', with nothing to do with romantic or sexual reality which were believed to be fundamentally contrary to monastic life. Julia Kristeva said that this is reflected much more accurately by the concept of 'imaginatio' than 'amor' (romantic love): "It constituted the intimate link between being and the world, through which the person may assimilate the exterior world while also defining the self as a subject". The only direct reference among his works to Aelred's personal lust is in fact to a "saucy serving girl" he desired when he was a steward at the court of David I.

Aelred's works exhorted chastity among the unmarried and widowed, and fidelity within marriage – condemning sexual relationships and activity outside marriage as sinful.

In modern times, several gay-friendly organizations have adopted Aelred as their patron saint, including Integrity USA in the Episcopal Church in the United States of America, the National Anglican Catholic Church in the northeast United States, and the Order of St. Aelred in the Philippines.

Patronage
Saint Aelred Catholic Church* located in Bishop, Georgia is part of The Personal Ordinariate of the Chair of St. Peter is named after him.
A primary school in York is named after him. A secondary school named after him in Glenburn, Renfrewshire, Scotland closed in 1990. A secondary school named after him in Newton-le-Willows, Merseyside, closed in 2011. Since 2019 there is a hermitage named after him in Jever, Lower Saxony, Germany (2012-2019 in Schortens, also Lower Saxony).

Writings

For his efforts in writing and administration Aelred was called by David Knowles the "St. Bernard of the North." Knowles, a historian of monasticism in England, also described him as "a singularly attractive figure," saying that "No other English monk of the twelfth century so lingers in the memory."

All of Aelred's works have appeared in translation, most in English and in French; the remaining three volumes of his sermons are being translated into English and will appear from Cistercian Publications in 2018–2020. There are already available in French in a five-volume edition.

Extant works by Aelred include:

Histories and biographies
Vita Davidis Scotorum regis ("Life of David, King of the Scots"), written c. 1153.
Genealogia regum Anglorum ("Genealogy of the Kings of the English"), written 1153–54.
Relatio de Standardo ("On the Account of the Standard"), also De bello standardii ("On the Battle of the Standard"), 1153–54. 
Vita S. Eduardi, regis et confessoris ("The Life of Saint Edward, King and Confessor"), 1161–63.
Vita S. Niniani ("The Life of Saint Ninian"), 1154–60.
De miraculis Hagustaldensis ecclesiae ("On the Miracles of the Church of Hexham"), ca. 1155.
De quodam miraculo miraculi ("A Certain Wonderful Miracle") (wrongly known since the seventeenth century as De Sanctimoniali de Wattun ("The Nun of Watton")), c. 1160
Spiritual treatises
Speculum caritatis ("The Mirror of Charity"), ca. 1142.
De Iesu puero duodenni ("Jesus as a Boy of Twelve"), ?1160–62.
De spirituali amicitiâ ("Spiritual Friendship"), 1164–67.
De institutione inclusarum ("The Formation of Anchoresses"), ?1160–62.
Oratio pastoralis ("Pastoral Prayer"), c. 1163–67.
De anima ("On the Soul"), c.1164–67.
Sermons
 These sermons mainly relate to the seventeen liturgical days on which Cistercian abbots were required to preach to their community. 
 Several non-liturgical sermons survive as well, including one he apparently preached to a clerical synod, presumably in connection with a journey to the general chapter at Cîteaux, and one devoted to Saint Katherine of Alexandria. 
 In 1163-4 he also wrote a 31-sermon commentary on Isaiah 13–16, Homeliae de oneribus propheticis Isaiae ("Homilies on the Prophetic Burdens of Isaiah"), submitting the work for evaluation to Gilbert Foliot, who became bishop of London in 1163.

Works

Critical editions
 Aelred of Rievaulx, '"Opera omnia." Corpus Christianorum Continuatio Mediaevalis 1, 2A, 2B, 2C, 2D, 3, 3A. Turnhout, Belgium: Brepols Publishers, 1971, 1989, 2001, 2012, 2005, 2015, 2017.
Aelred of Rievaulx, For Your Own People: Aelred of Rievaulx's Pastoral Prayer, trans. Mark DelCogliano, crit. ed. Marsha L. Dutton, Cistercian Fathers series 73 (Kalamazoo: Cistercian Publications, 2008). [Translation of Oratio Pastoralis].

Translations
Walter Daniel, Vita Ailredi Abbatis Rievall. Ed. and transl. Maurice Powicke (Oxford: Clarendon Press, 1950). [Translation reprinted with a new introduction as The Life of Aelred of Rievaulx and the Letter to Maurice.  Translated by F. M. Powicke and Jane Patricia Freeland, Introduction by Marsha Dutton, Cistercian Fathers series no. 57 (Kalamazoo, MI: Cistercian Publications, 1994.)]
Aelred of Rievaulx, On Jesus at Twelve Years Old, trans. Geoffrey Webb and Adrian Walker, Fleur de Lys series 17 (London: A. R. Mobray and Co., Ltd., 1955).
Aelred of Rievaulx, Treatises and Pastoral Prayer, Cistercian Fathers series 2 (Kalamazoo: Cistercian Publications, 1971). [includes De Institutione inclusarum, "De Jesu," and "Oratio Pastoralis."]
Aelred of Rievaulx, Dialogue on the Soul, trans. C. H. Talbot, Cistercian Father series 22 (Kalamazoo: Cistercian Publications, 1981).
Aelred of Rievaulx, Vita Niniani, translated by Winifred MacQueen, in John MacQueen, St. Nynia (Edinburgh: Polygon, 1990) [reprinted as (Edinburgh: John Donald, 2005)].
Aelred of Rievaulx, Mirror of Charity, trans. Elizabeth Connor, Cistercian Fathers series 17 (Kalamazoo: Cistercian Publications, 1990).
Aelred of Rievaulx, The Life of Saint Edward, King and Confessor, translated by Jerome Bertram (Guildford: St. Edward's Press, 1990) [reprinted at Southampton: Saint Austin Press, 1997].
 Aelred of Rievaulx, Spiritual Friendship, trans. Mark F. Williams (London: University of Scranton Press, 1994).
Aelred of Rievaulx, The Liturgical Sermons I: The First Clairvaux Collection, Advent—All Saints, translated by Theodore Berkeley and M. Basil Pennington . Sermons 1–28, Advent – All Saints. Cistercian Fathers series no. 58, (Kalamazoo: Cistercian Publications, 2001).
Aelred of Rievaulx, The Historical Works, trans. Jane Patricia Freeland, ed. Marsha L. Dutton, Cistercian Fathers series 56 (Kalamazoo: Cistercian Publications, 2005).
Aelred of Rievaulx, The Lives of the Northern Saints, trans. Jane Patricia Freeland, ed. Marsha L. Dutton, Cistercian Fathers series 71 (Kalamazoo: Cistercian Publications, 2006).
Aelred of Rievaulx, Spiritual Friendship, trans. Lawrence Braceland, ed. Marsha L. Dutton, Cistercian Fathers series 5 (Collegeville: Cistercian Publications, 2010).
Aelred of Rievaulx, "The Liturgical Sermons: The First Clairvaux Collection, Advent-All Saints," transl. Theodore Berkeley and M. Basil Pennington, Cistercian Fathers series 58 (Kalamazoo, MI: Cistercian Publications, 2001). 
Aelred of Rievaulx, "The Liturgical Sermons: The Second Clairvaux Collection, Advent-All Saints," transl. Marie Anne Mayeski, Cistercian Fathers series 71 (Collegeville, MN: Cistercian Publications, 2016).
Aelred of Rievaulx, "The Liturgical Sermons: The Durham and Lincoln Collections," transl. Kathryn Krug, Lewis White, et al., Ed. and Intro. Ann Astell, Cistercian Fathers series 58 (Collegeville, MN: Cistercian Publications, forthcoming 2019).
Aelred of Rievaulx, "The Liturgical Sermons: The Reading Collection, Advent-All Saints," transl. Daniel Griggs, Cistercian Fathers series 81 (Collegeville, MN: Cistercian Publications, 2018). 
Aelred of Rievaulx, "Homilies on the Prophetic Burdens of Isaiah," trans. Lewis White, Cistercian Fathers series 83 (Collegeville, MN: Cistercian Publications, 2018).
 (fr.) Aelred de Rievaulx, Sermons. La collection de Reading (sermons 85-182), trans. G. de Briey(+), G. Raciti, intro. X. Morales, Corpus Christianorum in Translation 20 (Turnhout: Brepols Publishers, 2015)
Aelred of Rievaulx, Writings on Body and Soul, ed. and trans. Bruce L. Venarde, Dumbarton Oaks Medieval Library 71 (Cambridge, MA: Harvard University Press, 2021)

Notes

References

Burton, Pierre-André, Aelred de Rievaulx (1110–1167): De l'homme éclaté à l'être unifié. Essai de biographie existentielle et spirituelle. Paris: Éditions du Cerf, 2010.
Burton, Pierre-André, Aelred de Rievaulx (1110–1167): An Existential and Spiritual Biography, translated by Christopher Coski. Cistercian Studies series no. 276, (Collegeville: Cistercian Publications, 2020).
Sommerfeldt, John R., Aelred of Rievaulx: Pursuing Perfect Happiness. Mahwah, NJ: Newman Press, 2005.

Further reading
Boquet, Damien, L'ordre de l'affect au Moyen Âge: Autour de l'anthropologie affective d'Aelred de Rievaulx. Caen: CRAHM, 2005.
 Christensen, Katherine, "Walter Daniel's Life of Aelred of Rievaulx: The Heroism of Intelligence and the Miracle of Love," in Jason Glenn (ed), The Middle Ages in Texts and Texture: Reflections on Medieval Sources (Toronto, University of Toronto, 2012),
Dutton, Marsha L.,"Friendship and the Love of God: Augustine's Teaching in the Confessions and Aelred of Rievaulx's Response in Spiritual Friendship", in American Benedictine Review 56 (2005), p. 3–40.
Dutton, Marsha L., "A Model for Friendship: Ambrose's Contribution to Aelred of Rievaulx's Spiritual Friendship, The American Benedictine Review 64 (2013): 39–66.
Dutton, Marsha L., "A Historian's Historian: The Place of Bede in Aelred's Contributions to the New History of his Age", in: Marsha L. Dutton, Daniel M. La Corte, and Paul Lockey (ed.), Truth as Gift: Studies in Cistercian History in Honor of John R. Sommerfeldt (Cistercian Studies Series 204). Kalamazoo: Cistercian, 2004, p. 407–48.
Dutton, Marsha L., "Sancto Dunstano Cooperante: Aelred of Rievaulx’s Advice to the Heir to the English Throne in Genealogy of the Kings of the English," in: Emilia Jamroziak and Janet Burton (ed.), Religious and Laity in Northern Europe 1000–1400: Interaction, Negotiation, and Power. Turnhout: Brepols, 2007, p. 183–195.
Freeman, Elizabeth, "Aelred of Rievaulx’s De Bello Standardii: Cistercian Historiography and the Creation of Community Memories," in: Cîteaux 49 (1998), p. 5–28.
Freeman, Elizabeth, "The Many Functions of Cistercian Histories Using Aelred of Rievaulx’s Relatio de Standardo as a Case Study," in: Erik Kooper (ed.) The Medieval Chronicle: Proceedings of the 1st International Conference on the Medieval Chronicle. Amsterdam, Atlanta: Rodopi, 1999, p. 124–32.
Freeman, Elizabeth, Narratives of a New Order: Cistercian Historical Writing in England, 1150–1220. Turnhout: Brepols, 2002.
Freeman, Elizabeth, "Nuns in the Public Sphere: Aelred of Rievaulx's De Sanctimoniali de Wattun and the Gendering of Authority", in: Comitatus 17 (1996), p. 55–80.
Garrison, John, “One Mind, One Heart, One Purse: Integrating Friendship Traditions and the Case of Troilus and Criseyde,” in Medievalia et Humanistica 36 (2010), p. 25–48.
La Corte, Daniel M., "Abbot as Magister and Pater in the Thought of Bernard of Clairvaux and Aelred of Rievaulx", in: Marsha L. Dutton, Daniel M. La Corte, and Paul Lockey (ed.), Truth as Gift: Studies in Cistercian History in Honor of John R. Sommerfeldt (Cistercian Studies Series 204). Kalamazoo: Cistercian, 2004, p. 389–406.
Mayeski, Marie Anne, "Secundam naturam: The Inheritance of Virtue in Ælred’s Genealogy of the English Kings", in: Cistercian Studies Quarterly 37 (2002), p. 221–28.
Nouzille, Philippe, Expérience de Dieu et Théologie Monastique au XIIe Siècle: Étude sur les sermons d'Aelred de Rievaulx. Paris: Les Éditions du Cerf, 1999.
Powicke, Frederick M., "Ailred of Rievaulx", in Ways of Medieval Life and Thought. London, 1949.
Raciti, Gaetano. "The Preferential Option for the Weak in the Ælredian Community Model", CSQ 32 (1997), p. 3–23.
Ransford, Rosalind, "A Kind of Noah's Ark: Aelred of Rievaulx and National Identity", Stuart Mews (ed.), Studies in Church History 18 (1982), p. 137–46.
Sommerfeldt, John R., Aelred of Rievaulx on Love and Order in the World and the Church (Mahwah, NJ: Newman Press, 2006).
Squire, Aelred, "Aelred and King David", Collectanea Cisterciensia 22 (1960), p. 356–77.
Squire, Aelred, "Aelred and the Northern Saints.", Collectanea Cisterciensia 23 (1961), p. 58–69.
Squire, Aelred, Aelred of Rievaulx: A Study, Cistercian Studies 50 (Kalamazoo: Cistercian Publications, 1969).
Squire, Aelred, "Historical Factors in the Formation of Aelred of Rievaulx", Collectanea Cisterciensia 22 (1960), p. 262–82.
Yohe, Katherine, "Aelred’s Recrafting of the Life of Edward the Confessor", CSQ 38 (2003): 177–89.

Bibliographies
Burton, Pierre-André. Bibliotheca Aelrediana Secunda: Une Bibliographie Cumulative (1962[-]1996). Fédération Internationale des Instituts d'Études Médiévales. Textes et Études du Moyen Âge, 7. Louvain-la-Neuve (France), 1997.
Dutton, Marsha L. "Aelred of Rievaulx." Oxford Bibliographies in Medieval Studies. New York, 2013. www.oxfordbiblographies.com.
Hoste, Anselm. "Bibliotheca Aelrediana: Survey of Manuscripts, Old Catalogues, Editions and Studies concerning St. Aelred of Rievaulx." Steenbrugge, 1962.

1110 births
1167 deaths
12th-century Christian saints
12th-century English people
12th-century Latin writers
12th-century Christian mystics
Abbots of Rievaulx
Pre-Reformation Anglican saints
Anglo-Saxon saints
Christian hagiographers
Cistercian mystics
English Cistercians
Medieval English historians
English sermon writers
Medieval English saints
Writers from Hexham
English Roman Catholic saints
LGBT and Anglicanism
Medieval LGBT history
Anglican saints